Namgyal dynasty may refer to: 

 Namgyal dynasty of Sikkim
 Namgyal dynasty of Ladakh